Famous residents (past and present) of Gateshead, Tyne and Wear, England, United Kingdom

Eliezer Adler – Founder of Jewish Community
 Marcus Bentley – Narrator of Big Brother
Thomas Bewick – Engraver
William Booth – Founder of the Salvation Army
Catherine Booth – William's daughter. Known as 'La Marechale' she founded the Salvation Army in continental Europe
Mary Bowes – 'The Unhappy Countess' Author and celebrity
Ian Branfoot – Football manager
Richard Brodie - Former footballer and current manager of Skelmersdale United
Frank Clark – Footballer and Manager
Harry Clasper – Oarsman
David Clelland – Labour politician and MP
Joseph Cowen – Radical politician
Steve Cram – Athlete Middle distance runner
Emily Davies – Educational reformer and feminist. Founder of Girton College Cambridge
Daniel Defoe – Writer and government agent
Madeleine Hope Dodds – Historian, co-founder of Progressive Players - Little Theatre Gateshead
Jonathan Edwards – Athlete and television presenter
Sir George Elliot – Industrialist and MP
Paul Gascoigne – Footballer
Robert Gilchrist (Poet) – Poet/Songwriter
Alex Glasgow – Singer/Songwriter
Leib Gurwicz – Rabbi, former Dean of Gateshead Yeshiva
Jill Halfpenny – Actress
Michelle Heaton – Member of Liberty X
David Hodgson – Football manager
Sharon Hodgson – Member of Parliament
Norman Hunter – Footballer, member of 1966 World Cup winning England squad
Don Hutchison – Footballer
Brian Johnson – Current lead singer with rock band AC/DC
Tommy Johnson – Footballer, ex Celtic
Howard Kendall – Footballer and football manager
Gibson Kyle - 19th century architect
John Thomas Looney – Shakespeare scholar
Justin McDonald – Actor
Lawrie McMenemy – Soccer manager and pundit
Robert Stirling Newall – Industrialist
Albert Oxley – footballer
Sebastian Payne – Political journalist
Lord Plender – Chartered accountant and public servant
Bezalel Rakow – Communal rabbi
James Renforth – Oarsman
Geordie Ridley – Composer of 'Blaydon Races'
Chris Ryan – SAS Soldier, holder of the longest escape and evasion record in British military history
William Shield – Composer, and Master of the King's Musick
Githa Sowerby – English playwright
Christina Stead – Australian novelist
John Steel – Drummer, The Animals
Steve Stone – Footballer
Sir Joseph Swan – Inventor of the electric light bulb
Chris Waddle – Footballer
William Wailes – Stained glass maker
Taylor Wane – Porn star
Robert Spence Watson – Public benefactor
Sylvia Waugh – Author of the 'Mennyms' series for children
John Wilson – Conductor, and founder of the John Wilson Orchestra
Thomas Wilson – Poet, school founder
(William) Robert Wood – Activist and Senator (migrated to Australia 1963)

Gateshead